Crimora is a genus of sea slugs, specifically nudibranchs, shell-less marine gastropod molluscs in the family Polyceridae.

Species 
Species in the genus Crimora include:

 Crimora coneja  Er. Marcus, 1961 rabbit doris
 Crimora edwardsi (Angas, 1864)
 Crimora lutea  Baba, 1949
 Crimora multidigitalis (Burn, 1957)
 Crimora papillata  Alder and Hancock, 1862

References

Polyceridae